Dele Yampolsky (born 28 July 1988 as/ Bamidele Ogunsanya) is a Nigerian-born Israeli footballer who plays as a midfielder for Maccabi Sha'arayim.

His first name "Bamidele" means "Follow me home" in Yoruba. His unique surname is the result of being adopted by his stepfather who is Israeli of Russian descent and moved him and his mother from Nigeria to Israel after getting married.

Biography 
In 2004 Yampolsky moved to Maccabi Netanya there he played for two years in the youth team until he got promoted to the senior side there he became a permanent part of the team.

On June 20, 2011, after 7 years in Netanya he moved to Maccabi Haifa for a fee of $440,000. He rejected a move to TSV 1860 München and Hapoel Tel Aviv in order to get a chance to play in the Champions League with Haifa.

After two seasons with Maccabi Haifa he was released from his contract and on September 16, 2013, Yampolsky moved to play for the local rival Hapoel Haifa under a contract of $90,000 per season. He played in Hapoel for only one season.

On August 19, 2014, Yampolsky signed a one-year deal with Hapoel Ra'anana. After an unsuccessful season with Ra'anana, he moved to play in the Liga Leumit with Bnei Lod for the 2015–16 season. He was released from Bnei Lod in January 2016. On July 10, 2016, Yampolsky signed for one season with Sektzia Ness Ziona from Liga Alef.

In January 2019, Yampolsky joined Shimshon Kfar Qasem.

Club career statistics
(correct as of 28 August 2014)

Honours
Israeli Premier League:
Runner-up (3): 2006–07, 2007–08, 2012–13
Israel State Cup:
Runner-up (1): 2012

Personal life

Footnotes

External links
Profile and statistics of Dela Yampolsky at One

1988 births
Living people
Israeli footballers
Nigerian footballers
Nigerian emigrants to Israel
Naturalized citizens of Israel
Israeli people of Nigerian descent
Israeli people of Yoruba descent
Jewish Israeli sportspeople
Gadna Tel Aviv Yehuda F.C. players
Maccabi Netanya F.C. players
Maccabi Haifa F.C. players
Hapoel Haifa F.C. players
Hapoel Ra'anana A.F.C. players
Hapoel Bnei Lod F.C. players
Sektzia Ness Ziona F.C. players
Hapoel Ironi Baqa al-Gharbiyye F.C. players
F.C. Kafr Qasim players
Shimshon Kafr Qasim F.C. players
Maccabi Sha'arayim F.C. players
Ironi Kuseife F.C. players
F.C. Tira players
Hapoel Ashkelon F.C. players
Hapoel Ironi Safed F.C. players
Israeli Premier League players
Liga Leumit players
Footballers from Tel Aviv
Yoruba sportspeople
Association football midfielders
Nigerian Jews